Henry Noris (29 August 1631 – 23 February 1704), or Enrico Noris, was an Italian church historian, theologian and Cardinal.

Biography
Noris was born at Verona, and was baptized with the name Hieronymus (Girolamo). His ancestors were Irish. His father, Alessandro had written a work on the German wars. At the age of fifteen he was sent to study under the Jesuits at Rimini, and there entered the novitiate of the Hermits of Saint Augustine, OESA, where he took the name ″Enrico″. He caught the attention of his Order's Father Assistant of Italy, Fr. Celestino Bruni, who recommended him to the attention of the Father General, Fr. Fulgencio Petrelli (1645-1648). After his probation he was sent to Rome to study theology. He lived in his Order's house at Sant'Agostino, in the company of a number of scholars in secular and ecclesiastical history, including Fr. Christian Lupus, OESA. He taught the sacred sciences at his order's houses in Pesaro, Perugia, and Padua.

There he completed The History of Pelagianism and Dissertations on the Fifth General Council, the two works which, before and after his death, occasioned much controversy. Together with the Vindiciae Augustinianae they were printed at Padua in 1673, having been approved by a special commission at Rome. Noris himself went to Rome to give an account of his orthodoxy before this commission, where he came to the (favorable) attention of the Assessor at the Holy Office, Msgr. Girolamo Casante. 
 
Pope Clement X named him one of the qualificators of the Holy Office, in recognition of his learning and sound doctrine. In 1674, Noris was appointed court Theologian to Grand Duke Cosimo III of Tuscany, on the recommendation of Antonio Magliabecci, the Ducal Librarian. It was Cosimo III who appointed him lecturer in Sacred History at the University of Pisa (not Padua).

But, after the publication of these works, further charges were made against him of teaching the errors of Jansenius and Baius. In a brief to the prefect of the Spanish Inquisition, 31 July 1748, ordering the name of Noris to be taken off the list of forbidden books, Pope Benedict XIV says that these charges were never proved; that they were rejected repeatedly by the Holy Office, and repudiated by the popes who had honoured him.

In 1675 he was admitted to Queen Christina of Sweden's salon in Rome. A fellow member was Cardinal Vincenzo Maria Orsini, the future Pope Benedict XIII. After her death in 1689, a formal Academy was founded in Rome, the Arcadian Academy, and Noris was a member.

It is said that Noris was offered the bishopric of Pistoia, which he refused.  This would have been in 1678, when the incumbent died.

In 1692 Noris was made assistant Librarian in the Vatican by Pope Innocent XII. The Librarian at the time was Cardinal Girolamo Casanata, the same person who had supported Noris when he was brought before the Inquisition. On 12 December 1695, Noris was named Cardinal-Priest of the Title of Sant'Agostino. In 1700, on the death of Cardinal Casanate, he was given full charge of the Vatican Library.

Cardinal Noris participated in the 1700 Conclave after the death of Pope Innocent XII (Pignatelli), which elected Pope Clement XI (Albani)on 23 November.

He died in Rome on 23 February 1704, at the age of 72, and was buried in his titular church of Sant'Agostino.

Works

His works, apart from some minor controversial treatises, are highly valued for accuracy and thoroughness of research. In addition to those already named, the most important are: "Annus et Epochae Syro-Macedonum in Vetustis Urbium Syriae Expositae"; "Fasti Consulares Anonimi e Manuscripto Bibliothecae Caesareae Deprompti"; "Historia Controversiae de Uno ex Trinitate Passo"; "Apologia Monachorum Scythiae"; "Historia Donatistarum e Schedis Norisianis Excerptae"; "Storia delle Investiture delle Dignita Ecclesiastiche". Seleet portions of his works have been frequently reprinted: at Padua, 1673–1678, 1708; at Louvain, 1702; at Bassano, edited by Giovanni Lorenzo Berti, 1769. The best is the edition of all the works, in five folio volumes, by the Ballerini brothers, Verona, 1729-1741.

Notes

References
 , article written by Francis Edward Tourscher.
 
 Léon G. Pélissier, "Le card. Henri de Noris et sa correspondence," Studi e documenti di storia e diritto  11 (1890), 25-64; 253-332.
 Hugo von Hurter, Nomenclator. Katholik, I (1884), 181.
 Pietro and Girolamo Ballerini, Vita Norisii in their ed. of Noris' works, IV (Verona, 1729–41); a shorter Life is prefixed to the edition of Padua, 1708.
 Life (Vita Eminentissimi Auctoris), by Hieronymys Zazzerio, OESA, included in the 1708 edition of Noris, Historia Pelagiana (Patavii 1708); and reprinted in  J. L. Berti, OESA (editor), Henrici Norisii Opera Omnia Theologica Tomus Primus (Venice 1769).
 Giovanni Mario Crescimbeni, Le Vite degli Arcadi illustri Parte I (Roma: Antonio de' Rossi 1708), 199-222 ("Life" by Msgr. Francesco Bianchini, a member of the Arcadian Academy).
 Lanteri, Postrema Saecula Sex Religionis Augustinianae, III (Tolentino, 1858), 64 sq.
 Mario Guarnacci,  Vitae et res gestae Pontificum Romanorum et S. R. E. Cardinalium  Tomus primus (Romae: typis Bernabo & Lazzarini 1751), pp. 447–454.
 Michael Klaus Wernicke, Kardinal Enrico Noris und siene Verteidigung Augustins (Würzburg : Augustinus-Verlag, 1973).
 Life of Cardinal Enrico Noris (with copious references)

1631 births
1704 deaths
Augustinian friars
Academic staff of the University of Perugia
Academic staff of the University of Padua
17th-century Italian cardinals
17th-century Italian historians
17th-century Italian Roman Catholic theologians
Patristic scholars
Italian people of Irish descent
Religious leaders from Verona
17th-century Italian Roman Catholic priests
18th-century Italian Roman Catholic priests
18th-century Italian cardinals
Italian librarians